Epidola semitica is a moth of the family Gelechiidae. It was described by Hans Georg Amsel in 1942. It is found in Palestine.

References

Moths described in 1942
Epidola